This is a list of current and former state prisons in Connecticut. These are overseen by the Connecticut Department of Correction.

This list does not include federal prisons located in the state of Connecticut.  There are no county jails in Connecticut, all inmates are in custody of the Department of Correction. Inmate population is current as of December 2021.

 Bridgeport Correctional Center (inmate population 700)
 Brooklyn Correctional Institution (inmate population 346)
 Cheshire Correctional Institution (inmate population 1148)
 Corrigan-Radgowski Correctional Center (inmate population 642) Radgowski building closed October 2021
 Garner Correctional Institution (inmate population 482)
 Hartford Correctional Center (inmate population 937)
 MacDougall-Walker Correctional Institution (inmate population 1749)
 Manson Youth Institution (inmate population 298)
 New Haven Correctional Center (inmate population 676)
 Osborn Correctional Institution (inmate population 1839)
 Robinson Correctional Institution (inmate population 644)
 Willard-Cybulski Correctional Institution (inmate population 373)
 York Correctional Institution (inmate population 588)

Closed facilities 

 Bergin Correctional Institution (closed 2011)
 Enfield Correctional Institution (closed 2018)
 Gates Correctional Institution (closed 2011)
 Niantic Annex (closed Jan 2016)
 Northern Correctional Institution (closed June 2021)
 the colonial Old Newgate Prison (closed 1827)
 Webster Correctional Institution (closed 2010)
 Wethersfield State Prison (closed 1963)

References

External links
Connecticut Department of Correction

Connecticut
 
Prisons